Joseph-Octave Lavallée (21 February 1878 – 10 September 1940) was a journalist and political figure in Quebec. He represented Bellechasse in the House of Commons of Canada from 1911 to 1916 as a Conservative.

He was born in Berthier, Quebec, the son of Octave Lavallée and Philomène Champagne, and was educated at the Séminaire de Joliette. Lavallée lived in St-Cajetan d'Armagh. In 1901, he married Maria Demers at Berthierville, Quebec. He was a director of the Strathcona Assurance Company and Blais Co. Ltd. Lavallée resigned his seat in the House of Commons in 1916 to run unsuccessfully for a seat in the Legislative Assembly of Quebec.

Electoral history

References

Members of the House of Commons of Canada from Quebec
Conservative Party of Canada (1867–1942) MPs
1878 births
1940 deaths